You'd Be Surprised is a 1940 thriller novel by the British writer Peter Cheyney. It is the sixth in his series of novels featuring the FBI agent Lemmy Caution. Unlike several of the others it has not been adapted for film.

References

Bibliography
 James, Russell. Great British Fictional Detectives. Remember When, 21 Apr 2009.
 Pitts, Michael R. Famous Movie Detectives. Scarecrow Press, 1979.
 Reilly, John M. Twentieth Century Crime & Mystery Writers. Springer, 2015.
 Server, Lee. Encyclopedia of Pulp Fiction Writers. Infobase Publishing, 2014.

1940 British novels
Novels by Peter Cheyney
British thriller novels
Novels set in London
British crime novels
William Collins, Sons books